The Minister for the Prevention of Family and Sexual Violence is a ministerial portfolio in the New Zealand Government, charged with leading the Government approach to addressing and combating domestic violence in New Zealand. The position was first established during the Sixth Labour Government of New Zealand following the 2020 New Zealand general election.

The incumbent Minister of Marama Davidson, a member Green Party of Aotearoa New Zealand. She took office on 6 November 2020 and is so far the only person to have held the office. As Davidson holds the role under a co-operation agreement between the Green Party and the Governing New Zealand Labour Party, she is not a member of cabinet meaning the role has never been held by a cabinet minister.

Roles and Responsible

The Minister for the Prevention of Family and Sexual Violence is primarily part of the New Zealand Ministry of Justice, although a number of other Government agencies also provide support for the role. According to the Government website, the Minister is Responsible for leading the whole-of-government approach to substantially prevent, reduce and address family and sexual violence, and for the joint venture on the prevention of family and sexual violence.

The office holder is in charge of coordinating in the government budget relating to the issue of family and sexual violence, and is also a member of the Ministerial group on Child and Youth Wellbeing Strategy.

History

The role was created after the Sixth Labour Government of New Zealand was re-elected to a second term in a landslide election victory, the office was officially created on 6 November 2020, following in the swearing in of the 53rd New Zealand Parliament and the second Jacinda Ardern ministry.

The position is a loose spiritual successor to the Parliamentary Under-Secretary for Justice (Family and Sexual Violence Issues), which was held by Green MP Jan Logie during the first term of the Sixth Labour Government.

List of officeholders

As of July 2021, only one person has held the office, Green Party of Aotearoa New Zealand co-leader Marama Davidson, who took office upon the creation of the role after the Green Party signed a co-operation agreement with the Governing New Zealand Labour Party.

Key

References

Prevention of Family and Sexual Violence